Imaan Hammam (Arabic: إيمان همام) (born 5 October 1996) is a Dutch model of Moroccan and Egyptian descent. As of 2020, she has appeared on the cover of Vogue 18 times, four times on the American edition of Vogue.
She currently ranks on models.com's "Industry Icons" and was ranked on its "Top Sexiest Models" lists. As of 2021, she has appeared on the top four international Vogue covers: the American, Italian, French, and British editions.

Career 

Hammam is signed with DNA Model Management in New York, VIVA Model Management in Paris, London, and Barcelona, Why Not Model Management in Milan, and CODE Management in Amsterdam.

Hammam was first discovered in Amsterdam's Central Station by an agent from CODE Management in 2010 at age 14. In 2013, her agency sent her to Paris with VIVA Model Management and she was given the special honor to open the Givenchy show as an exclusive. Shortly after she appeared in consecutive issues of American, Italian and French Vogue. Anna Wintour is a supporter of Hammam and mentioned the model in her editor's letter the first time she appeared in the magazine.

She has appeared in editorials for American, French, Italian, British, Spanish, Dutch, Portuguese, Russian and German Vogue, Numéro, i-D, and LOVE. She also appeared on the September cover of American Vogue, a total of 4 times (September, March, April, December), a cover which very few models, much less new faces, are able to secure.

Hammam has walked the runways for nearly every top brand including Burberry, Alexander McQueen, Givenchy, Marc Jacobs, Maison Margiela, Prada, Michael Kors, Moschino, Chanel, DKNY, Jean Paul Gaultier, Hugo Boss, Nina Ricci, Jacquemus, Giambattista Valli, Isabel Marant, Dsquared2, Lanvin, Stella McCartney, Oscar de la Renta, Dolce & Gabbana, Alberta Ferretti, Derek Lam, Ralph Lauren, Carolina Herrera, Thierry Mugler, rag+bone, Emanuel Ungaro, Roberto Cavalli, Valentino, Balenciaga, Hermés, Tommy Hilfiger, Diane Von Furstenberg, Anna Sui, Vera Wang, Versace, Fendi, Proenza Schouler, Anna Sui, Tom Ford, Dior, Sportmax, Philipp Plein, Brandon Maxwell and Victoria's Secret.

She has appeared in advertising campaigns for Chanel, Versace, Moschino, Alexander McQueen, Revlon, Chloe, Givenchy, Sonia Rykiel, DKNY, Diane Von Furstenburg, Coach, Giorgio Armani, Tiffany & Co., Calvin Klein, Shiseido, H&M, Topshop, Express, Target and Scotch & Soda.

In April 2016, Hammam won Couturesque Magazine's Model of the Year competition, receiving more than half of the public vote against popular models Lucky Blue Smith and Bella Hadid.

For the H&M collaboration with Erdem, she's one of the collection's ambassadors.

Personal life 

Imaan Hammam was born in Amsterdam, Netherlands, to an Egyptian father and a Moroccan mother. She is a Muslim. Although she has been described as being "Middle Eastern", she does not see herself as such and identifies as Afro-Arab.

“Sometimes people call me Middle Eastern, and I'm like, 'No, I'm black.' I am proud of my culture, proud of who made me, proud to be here.”

“I’m half Moroccan, half Egyptian, and I was born in Amsterdam. I’m Muslim, and I’m superproud of my heritage and of my roots. I want to be a role model for young girls who are struggling with racism or struggling with their looks or with their skin color. I had Naomi Campbell, who I looked up to as a black powerful woman. But there aren’t many Arabic models, and being an African-Arabic model, I’m trying to open doors for more Arabic girls.”>

In 2019, Imaan announced a partnership with nonprofit organization She's the First as the organization's first global ambassador. On November 18, 2021, Imaan was honored by She's the First as the "Powerhouse of the Year" in a virtual awards ceremony, with the award presented by Anna Wintour. On Instagram, Imaan shared her thoughts on the honor: “I am so honored to be receiving the first-ever Powerhouse of the Year Award, standing alongside girls who have been breaking barriers and advancing public health initiatives in their communities as we show the world what true power looks like. Unfortunately, as Covid-19 is still a threat – She’s the First’s services are especially needed as vaccine access in these girls’ communities remains limited." 

In June 2020, she shared a series of infographics on Instagram created by the Students for Justice in Palestine at Georgetown University. Her post was done to call attention to the Israeli-Palestine conflict in West Asia. In December 2021, she volunteered for a food kitchen in New York City, along with models Melodie Monrose, Madison Headrick, and Cora Emmanuel, to help address the food insecurity problem in the area.

References

External links

 
 Imaan Hamman on Models.com

1996 births
Living people
Models from Amsterdam
Dutch female models
Dutch people of Egyptian descent
Dutch people of Moroccan descent
Dutch Muslims
Muslim models